Bernard Laidebeur (11 July 1942 – 21 April 1991) was a French athlete, who mainly competed in the 100 metres. He was born and died in Paris.

He competed for France at the 1964 Summer Olympics held in Tokyo, Japan, where he won the bronze medal with his team mates Paul Genevay, Claude Piquemal and Jocelyn Delecour in the men's 4 x 100 metre relay.

References
 

1942 births
1991 deaths
French male sprinters
Olympic bronze medalists for France
Athletes (track and field) at the 1964 Summer Olympics
Olympic athletes of France
Athletes from Paris
Medalists at the 1964 Summer Olympics
Olympic bronze medalists in athletics (track and field)
20th-century French people